The following is a list of some of the prominent alumni of Rashtriya Indian Military College, Dehradun, India. All students who graduate from this school are called Rimcollians.

Chief of Army Staff

General K.S. Thimayya
General G.G. Bewoor
General Vishwa Nath Sharma
General Sundararajan Padmanabhan
General Gul Hasan, Commander-in-Chief, Pakistan Army

Chief of Air Staff

Air Chief Marshal N.C. Suri
Air Marshal Asghar Khan, PAF
Air Marshal Nur Khan, PAF
Air Chief Marshal Birender Singh Dhanoa

Vice Chief of Army Staff

Lt General S. K. Singh, PVSM, UYSM, AVSM, ADC & Administrative Member, Armed Forces Tribunal
Lt General Chandi Prasad Mohanty PVSM,AVSM,SM,VSM is a General Officer in the Indian Army.

Vice Chief of Air Staff

Air Marshal Vinod Patney, SYSM, PVSM, AVSM, VrC, ADC, Ex-VCAS & Ex-AOC-in-C Western Air Command

GOC-in-C & GOC

Lt. General Premindra Singh Bhagat, PVSM, VC, GOC-in-C Central Command
Lt. General K.P. Candeth, GOC-in-C Western Command, Famous as the liberator of Goa
Lt. General Joginder Singh Dhillon, Padma Bhushan, GOC-in-C Central Command
Lt. General Chandi Prasad Mohanty,  AVSM, SM, VSM.
Lt. General Bikram Singh, GOC XV Corps killed in the 1963 Poonch Indian Air Force helicopter crash
Lt.General  Khwaja Wasiuddin.HPK.SPK Commander II Corps. Pakistan Army.

Adjutant General

Major General Hira Lal Atal
Lt. General M.M. Lakhera, PVSM, AVSM, VSM, Ex - Governor of Mizoram, Ex- Lt. Governor of Pondicherry, & Ex- Lt. Governor of Andaman & Nicobar Islands (additional charge).
Major General Karam Singh, PVSM, SM, Dy Adjutant General

Engineer-in-Chief

Lt General Sahabzada Yaqub Khan (Pakistan Army)

Commandant IMA

Lt Gen M.A. Zaki
Lt Gen Manvendra Singh, PVSM, AVSM, VSM (Ex- GOC 5 Mtn Div & Ex-GOC Delhi Area)

Indian National Army

Maj General Jaganath Rao Bhonsle
Burhan-ud-Din
Maj General Shah Nawaz Khan

Gallantry awards

Victoria Cross

Lt Gen Premindra Singh Bhagat, PVSM, VC

Param Vir Chakra

 Major Somnath Sharma

Vir Chakra

Lt Gen M.A. Zaki
Major Chandrakant Singh

Civilian awards

Padma Vibhushan

General K.S. Thimayya

Padma Bhushan

 Joginder Singh Dhillon
K.P. Candeth
Gopal Gurunath Bewoor

Padma Shri

Lt General M.A. Zaki
Lt General K.P. Candeth

Sports

Ritwik Bhattacharya, a world top 50 Squash player

Ministers

Maj General Shah Nawaz Khan, Minister of Railways, Central Government
Maj General J.K. Bhonsle, Minister of Rehabilitation, Central Government
Sahabzada Yaqub Khan, Foreign Minister, Pakistan
Naseerullah Babar, Interior Minister, Pakistan

Diplomats and Civil servants

Shaharyar Khan, Foreign Secretary, Head of Pakistan's Diplomatic Corps
Ashwani Kumar, Former Director CBI, Governor of Nagaland (21 March 2013 – 27 June 2014)
Rajiv Ratan, IPS, Additional Director General of Police, Telangana State
Lt Gen MM Lakhera, Lt Governor Puducherry and Governor of Mizoram, PVSM, AVSM, VSM

Authors and Academicians 

 Maj Gen Ashok Mehta, Author & Commentator
 Maj Gen Dipankar Banerjee, Author & Commentator

References

Where Gallantry is Tradition: Saga of Rashtriya Indian Military College, By Bikram Singh, Sidharth Mishra, Contributor Rashtriya Indian Military College, Published 1997 by Allied Publishers, Military education, 232 pages, 

Rashtriya Indian Military College